Hu Weiyong (died 1380) was a Chinese politician and the last chancellor of the Ming dynasty, from 1373 to 1380. Hu was accused of treason and was executed by Zhu Yuanzhang.

Hu was a main member of the Huaixi meritorious group faction. He was later accused of attempting to rebel and was thus executed by the Hongwu Emperor. More than 30,000 people were implicated in the case and executed as part of the Four Major Cases of the early Ming dynasty. Together with the other members of his clique, their offences were compiled in a book tilted Zhaoshi Jiandang Lu (The Record to Proclaim the Treacherous Clique), at the behest of the emperor. Besides, his biography topped the Biographies of the Treacherous Courtiers, History of Ming.

Biography 
Hu was born in Dingyuan, Haozhou (now a part of Chuzhou, Anhui province). In 1363 Hu contributed a large number of warships to Zhu Yuanzhang and met Li Shanchang, chief of warship production and Liu Bowen. Once Liu Bowen told Zhu that Hu Weiyong should not be prime minister. This made Hu Weiyong angry, so Hu and Zhu poisoned Liu Bowen to death. In the end, both Li and Hu were executed by the Zhu Yuanzhang for attempting to usurp the throne.

Arrest and execution 
Chancellor Hu Weiyong arrogated all authority to himself and accepted bribes, purging countless people without consulting the emperor, which stirred the wrath of other officers and the people. 

Hu was the Senior Grand Councilor and an administrator; however, over the years, the magnitude of his powers as well as involvement in several political scandals eroded the paranoid emperor's trust in him. 

In 1380, Yun Qi, a subordinate of Hu Weiyong reported to Zhu Yuanzhang that Hu Weiyong met with the envoy of another country secretly, attempting to rebel. Four days later Zhu had Hu Weiyong and his entire family arrested and executed on charges of treason.  

The emperor soon abolished the Chancellery of China, taking over direct responsibility of the Three Departments and Six Ministries. The Grand Secretariat later assumed responsibility for aiding the emperor in managing the state. When Zhu Yuanzhang eliminated the traditional offices of grand councilor, his main motive was Hu Weiyong's alleged attempt to usurp the throne.

Execution of Hu Weiyong's clique 
Using this as an opportunity to purge his government, the Zhu also ordered the execution of countless other officials, as well as their families, for association with Hu. The purge lasted over a decade and resulted in more than 30,000 executions. 

Together with the other members of his clique, their offences were compiled a book tilted Zhaoshi Jiandang Lu (The Record to Proclaim the Treacherous Clique), at the behest of the emperor. 

Some accounts narrate the dubious legends about Hu. It was said that some stalagmites emerged from the water of a well located in the yard of his former residence. Moreover, the tombs of his ancestors glowed in the night.

See also
Lan Yu
Li Shanchang
Liu Bowen
Yang Xian

References

Further reading 
 Mu: "China's ancient political gains"
 History Cultural China : "Abolishing the Chancellery of China - A Reform of Administrative System by Zhu Yuanzhang".

1380 deaths
Ming dynasty chancellors
Executed Ming dynasty people
Executed people from Anhui
People executed by the Ming dynasty
Politicians from Chuzhou
Victims of familial execution
Year of birth unknown